The following lists events that happened during 1959 in the Imperial State of Iran.

Incumbents
 Shah: Mohammad Reza Pahlavi 
 Prime Minister: Manouchehr Eghbal

Events

Establishment of Tehran Nuclear Research Center (TNRC).

March
 March 5 – At Ankara, the United States agreed to defend the remaining members of the Central Treaty Organization in case of attack, signing bilateral defense agreements with Iran, Turkey and Pakistan.

See also
 Years in Iraq
 Years in Afghanistan

References

 
Iran
Years of the 20th century in Iran
1950s in Iran
Iran